Down at Your Life is the second full-length album by Shaft. It was released in 2006 on Lil' Chief Records.

Track listing
All tracks by RJ Cardy

 "My Favourite Story" – 2:53
 "Down At Your Life" – 2:56
 "Inside" – 4:51
 "Our Blue Hell" – 2:55
 "Pacific Ocean" – 3:58
 "Alive Alive" – 3:21
 "Someone To Blame" – 3:19
 "Got To Be Strong" – 5:08
 "I Just Don't Know How To Live My Life" – 4:13
 "Three Little Pigs" – 5:04
 " My Momma" - 2:13 (Bonus Track)

Personnel 

Bob Frisbee – producer, mastering, mixing, overdub engineer
Rich Mixture – organ, percussion, piano, drums, backing vocals, chorus, slide guitar, fender rhodes, mastering, mixing, overdub engineer

External links
 Lil' Chief Records: Shaft
 Shaft on MySpace
 Lil' Chief Records

2006 albums
Shaft (New Zealand band) albums
Lil' Chief Records albums